Rise and Fall, Rage and Grace is the eighth studio album by American punk rock band The Offspring, released on June 11, 2008, by Columbia Records. It was the band's first album of new material in five years, following 2003's Splinter, marking their longest gap between studio albums at the time. The Offspring had been working on new material since the fall of 2004, but showed no further signs of progress until November 2006, when they announced on their official website that they had begun recording with producer Bob Rock. The writing and recording process, spanning four years and three recording studios, was finally finished in April 2008.

The album produced four singles: "Hammerhead", "You're Gonna Go Far, Kid", "Kristy, Are You Doing Okay?", and "Half-Truism".

Writing and recording
Work for Rise and Fall, Rage and Grace dates back to September 2004, when frontman Dexter Holland said that he wanted to put out the next Offspring album in 2005 and that the new songs felt "pretty good". From June to August 2005, the band played the Vans Warped Tour for the first time, and followed that with a tour of Europe and Japan. To coincide with that tour, Sony Music released the first Offspring compilation album, Greatest Hits, which includes their hits from 1994 to 2005. After the Greatest Hits tour ended in the fall of 2005, the band took a break from writing, recording and touring. On February 7, 2006, Holland said in his journal that the band entered a demo studio to work on guitar tracks, and a week later, Holland said in his journal that he went out of town to "meet with a guy who might produce" the album. On June 13, 2006, Holland stated that the band (minus Willard) had been meeting every week and would begin recording shortly. On August 18, he posted another update on the band's journal, saying that they had demoed five songs and were looking to go into the studio soon. He described the new songs as "lots of guitar, energy, lots of energy, and good songs." In September 2006, it was announced that the album would be produced by Bob Rock, who was working with Holland and "helping him sort out songs."

On November 16, 2006, the Offspring announced on their website that they had begun recording the album with Rock, with an intended release date of spring 2007. Recording took place in Hawaii and California with Rock. By May 2007 the music for thirteen songs had been recorded, with a further 10 tracks demoed. At this time Holland announced that all of the songs were completely new with no re-recordings of older songs, jokingly remarking "that would be cheating, wouldn't it?" (in response to rumors that the unreleased song "Pass Me By" and the re-recording of their 1992-song "Dirty Magic" would appear on the album) and commenting that the new tracks "sound like a friggin' freight train." In July 2007, Holland also confirmed that the band had finished "two more songs" and the album was being recorded in Orange County, California. On the Christmas journal entry, he claimed that he had two more lyrics to write, "a couple more" to sing and "various tweaks" to do before mixing could begin. The band was at that time taking a break to spend Christmas with their families.

In January 2008, the band comically responded to upset fans who wanted news by having a "breaking news" story regarding the band buying plane tickets for their next show. In his journal, Holland explained that when there were no updates, it's usually because there's nothing to talk about- hence the faux "news." The next month, Holland said that the Offspring were "just in the studio getting some tracks down for the new record" and claims "it's a lot louder than the last couple". He also said the band wasn't "going to be making another Smash, or another Ixnay" but thought they were still "relevant to punk when they were created, and this one will be no different".

Holland announced on April 9, 2008, that the new album was finally finished and announced the name and release date, and that "Hammerhead" would be the first single. The album's title is derived from two tracks: "Rise and Fall" is the last track on the album and the song "Fix You" features the line "Rage and Grace".

Promotion and release
In June 2008, shortly before the album's release, the influential L.A. station KROQ began playing "You're Gonna Go Far, Kid", making it seem possible that this could be the second single, though the station has played non-singles from the band in the past. Six other stations in the Southwestern United States followed suit. During the Offspring's three May 2008 concerts in California, "You're Gonna Go Far, Kid" was the only new song besides "Hammerhead" that was played, also causing fans to believe this would be the second single. "You're Gonna Go Far, Kid" was digitally released in Australia in July 2008 as a single and also appeared on the album cover as a sticker promoting the album as "includes the songs "Hammerhead and You're Gonna Go Far, Kid". In November 2008, KROQ briefly played "Stuff Is Messed Up", another song off the album, until the plug was pulled after "Kristy, Are You Doing Okay?" was confirmed as the third single.

On June 2, 2008, 30 second clips of each song on the new album were accidentally released by Amazon.com. They were removed swiftly but not before fans had ripped the clips and uploaded them to several fileshare and video sharing sites.

The official premiere of the album took place on the band's imeem site on June 9 at 3pm UTC.

Promotional tour
In 2007, the Offspring first premiered "Hammerhead" at the Summersonic Festival, before any details of the new album had been revealed. The song would later be played again on the first night of the Australian Soundwave Festival, before being replaced on the set-list by "Half-Truism". "Hammerhead" was then played again on the last night of Soundwave Festival. In May 2008, during their performances on San Diego X-Fest, KROQ Weenie Roast, and the KJEE Summer Roundup, they also premiered "You're Gonna Go Far, Kid" alongside "Hammerhead", and have since played both songs in their sets at the Electric Festival in Spain, Rock in Rio 2008 in Portugal and Rock am Ring and Rock im Park in Germany. The band also played a series of Japanese dates from October 6–21, 2008. After headlining the nineteenth annual KROQ Almost Acoustic Christmas on December 13, 2008, they went on hiatus for a few months. In March 2009, the Offspring announced on their official website that they would be touring North America from May through July with Dropkick Murphys, Alkaline Trio, Street Dogs, Pennywise, Shiny Toy Guns and Sum 41. The Offspring also joined 311 on their summer 2010 Unity Tour. The 19-date tour was held in amphitheaters around the U.S., also featuring Pepper as a special guest. After this, the Offspring played Japan's Summer Sonic Festival that August. Before the 311 and Pepper tour, the Offspring played four East Coast Dates in June, which was supported by Terrible Things.

Reception

Rise and Fall, Rage and Grace received mixed reviews from critics. While AllMusic's Stephen Thomas Erlewine criticized the band for not changing their sound or moving forward, Kerrang! positively stated that the album is "an exquisite reminder of what a fabulous band they are".

Commercial performance
Rise and Fall, Rage and Grace debuted at number 10 on the Billboard 200 with 45,700 units sold, significantly higher than Splinter'''s peak position at 30, but with sales considerably lower than the debuts of its predecessors  Splinter (87,000) and Conspiracy of One'' (125,000). As of May 2013, the album has sold more than 329,000 copies in North America.

Track listing

Personnel

The Offspring
 Dexter Holland – lead vocals, rhythm guitar, piano
 Noodles – lead guitar, backing vocals
 Greg K. – bass guitar, backing vocals

Additional personnel
Josh Freese – drums
Chris "X-13" Higgins – backing vocals

Production
 Bob Rock – producer, engineer
 Steve Masi – guitar technician
 Eric Helmkamp – engineer
 George Marino – mastering

Artwork
 Jason Goad – illustrations

Chart performance

Certifications and sales

Release history
Release dates from The Offspring's official website.

References

External links

Rise and Fall, Rage and Grace at YouTube (streamed copy where licensed)

 Official Page for the album

The Offspring albums
2008 albums
Columbia Records albums
Albums produced by Bob Rock